Meredith Anne Yayanos is a California-based violinist, vocalist and thereminist. Her work has been featured on tracks with artists including The Dresden Dolls, The Vanity Set, Revue Noir, David Garland and The Walkmen. Since 2021, Yayanos is a member of the feminist black metal band Feminazgûl.

Yayanos was a contributing artist to the comic book project 9-11: Emergency Relief, created to benefit the American Red Cross in the wake of the September 11, 2001 attacks. She is also the inspiration for a comic book character named Melanctha, appearing in the 21st issue of Planetary by Warren Ellis and John Cassaday.

She is also a photographer with a portfolio on flickr featuring fellow artists, New York scenery, and personal photos.  She is a founding member of the alternative magazine Coilhouse.

Discography
The following is a partial list of albums featuring Yayanos:
2001 – Raz Mesinai: Before the Law
2002 – Kings County Queens: Big Ideas
2002 – Love Life: Here Is Night, Brothers, Here the Birds Burn
2002 – The Vanity Set: Little Stabs at Happiness
2002 – The Walkmen: Everyone Who Pretended to Like Me Is Gone
2002 – Thomas Truax: Full Moon Over Wowtown
2003 – Piñataland: Songs From the Forgotten Future
2003 – David Garland: On the Other Side of the Window
2003 – Mike "Sport" Murphy: Uncle
2004 – Aaron English Band: All the Waters of This World
2004 – Barbez: Barbez
2004 – The Dresden Dolls: A Is for Accident
2004 – White Hassle: The Death of Song
2005 – Dame Darcy: Dame Darcy's Greatest Hits
2005 – Amiel: Accidents By Design
2005 – Botanica (Band): Botanica vs. the Truth Fish
2005 – Parker and Lily: The Low Lows
2005 – Thomas Traux: Audio Addiction
2005 – Revue Noir: Projekt Presents:  A Dark Cabaret
2006 – Various Artists: Brainwaves (song: "The Lovers" with Amanda Palmer
2008 – Faun Fables : A Table Forgotten
2009 – Elegi: Varde
2009 – Beats Antique: Contraption (EP Vol. 1)
2012 – Stolen Babies : "Naught" (song "Behind the Days")
2020 – Feminazgûl: No Dawn For Men
2021 – Feminazgûl: A Mallacht

References

External links
 
 
 The Vanity Set
 Coilhouse Magazine & Blog

Theremin players
Year of birth missing (living people)
Living people
Dark cabaret musicians
American women in electronic music
Women violinists
American people of Greek descent
20th-century American violinists
21st-century American violinists
20th-century American women musicians
21st-century American women musicians
Feminist musicians
Women in punk